White Cloud Peak 8, also known as WCP 8, at  above sea level is an unofficially named peak in the White Cloud Mountains of Idaho.

References 

Mountains of Custer County, Idaho
Mountains of Idaho
Sawtooth National Forest